Katie MacAlister (born 1964) is a Seattle-area author of fiction and non-fiction.  Her most popular titles are historical, contemporary, and paranormal romance.  She also writes young-adult books under the pseudonym Katie Maxwell and mysteries under the pseudonym Kate Marsh.

MacAlister's contemporary and historical books frequently feature Anglophile, flawed heroines who are tall, Rubenesque, klutzy, or divorced. Their male counterparts are typically men who have had something happen in their past.

Bibliography

Aisling Grey, Guardian series
 You Slay Me (2004)
 Fire Me Up (2005)
 Light My Fire (2006)
 Holy Smokes (2007)

Silver Dragons series
 Playing with Fire (2008)
 Up in Smoke (2008)
 Me and My Shadow (2009)

Light Dragons series
 Love in the Time of Dragons (2010)
 The Unbearable Lightness of Dragons (2011)
 Sparks Fly (2012)

Dragon Fall series
 Dragonblight (2021)
 Dragon Fall (2015)
 Dragon Storm (2015)
 Dragon Soul (2016)

The Dark Ones series
 A Girl's Guide To Vampires (2003)
 Sex and the Single Vampire (2004)
 Sex, Lies, and Vampires (2005)
 Even Vampires Get the Blues (2006)
 The Last of the Red Hot Vampires (2007)
 Zen and the Art of Vampires (2008)
 Crouching Vampire, Hidden Fang (2009)
 In the Company of Vampires (2010)
 Much Ado About Vampires (2011)
 A Tale of Two Vampires (2012)
 The Vampire Always Rises (2017)

Traveller series
 Time Thief (2013)
 The Art of Stealing Time (2013)

Contemporary romance
 Improper English (2003)
 Men in Kilts (2003)
 Bird of Paradise (novella) (2003)
 The Corset Diaries (2004)
 Hard Day's Knight (2005)
 Blow Me Down (2005)
 It's All Greek To Me (2011)

Ainsley Brothers series
 The Importance of Being Alice (2015)
 A Midsummer Night's Romp (2015)
 Daring in a Blue Dress (2016)
 The Perils of Paulie (2016)

Steampunk
 Steamed (2010)

Noble series
 Noble Intentions (2002)
 Noble Destiny (2003)
 The Trouble With Harry (2004)
 The Truth About Leo (2014)

Paranormal Romance Anthologies

Mysteries

(as Kate Marsh)

 Ghost of a Chance (2008)

Novellas 
 Ain't Myth-behaving [Two Novellas]

Young Adult
(as Katie Maxwell)
2003 – The Year My Life Went Down The Loo
2004 – They Wear What Under Their Kilts?
2004 – Eyeliner of the Gods
2004 – What's French For "Ew"?
2004 – The Taming of the Dru
2005 – Got Fangs?
2005 – Life, Love and the Pursuit of Hotties
2006 – Circus of the Darned

References

External links
Katie MacAlister's homepage
Katie MacAlister's blog
Katie Maxwell's homepage
Otherworld Encyclopedia, defining the world created by Katie MacAlister. Articles include characters, concepts, and books

1964 births
Living people
21st-century American novelists
Writers from Seattle
American historical novelists
American women novelists
Women historical novelists
Novelists from Washington (state)
21st-century American women writers